José Roberto Rodrigues Mota (born 10 May 1979), or simply José Mota, is a Brazilian former professional footballer who played as a striker.

Career
Mota joined Danish Superliga club Randers FC in September 2004, after having played for Portuguese clubs Rio Ave and Oliveirense. After impressing during his first six months at the club, he signed a two-and-a-half-year contract with league rivals Viborg FF on 12 January 2005. He scored in his debut against AGF, volleying home a cross from Christian Magleby in a 2–1 league win. He made 48 league appearances for the club, in which he managed to score 21 goals.

Mota joined AaB in January 2007, signing a four-year contract.

In 2010, Mota was the top scorer in the AFC Champions League with nine goals, though his Suwon Bluewings team only managed to reach the quarter final stage.

In 2011, he won Norwegian top division, Tippeligaen with Molde FK and Ole Gunnar Solskjær as manager.

In January 2012, Mota signed for South Korean professional league K-League side Busan I'Park on a free transfer.

Honours
Molde
 Tippeligaen: 2011

Individual
 Molde top scorer: 15 goals in 2008
 AFC Champions League top scorer: 2010

References

External links
  
 
  
  
 

Living people
1979 births
Brazilian footballers
Brazilian expatriate footballers
Rio Ave F.C. players
U.D. Oliveirense players
Randers FC players
Viborg FF players
AaB Fodbold players
Molde FK players
Suwon Samsung Bluewings players
Busan IPark players
Eliteserien players
Danish Superliga players
K League 1 players
Association football forwards
Expatriate footballers in Portugal
Brazilian expatriate sportspeople in Portugal
Expatriate men's footballers in Denmark
Brazilian expatriate sportspeople in Denmark
Expatriate footballers in Norway
Brazilian expatriate sportspeople in Norway
Expatriate footballers in South Korea
Brazilian expatriate sportspeople in South Korea
Footballers from São Paulo